Dankwarderode Castle on the Burgplatz ("castle square") in Braunschweig (Brunswick) is a Saxon lowland castle. It was the residence of the Brunswick dukes for centuries and, today, is part of the Herzog Anton Ulrich Museum.

Construction and history of use 
Dankwarderode Castle was built between c. 1160 and 1175 as the Pfalz of Duke Henry the Lion on an island in the river Oker. Next to the castle, construction of Brunswick Cathedral began in 1173. The castle lost its military significance as a defensive structure early, when it became surrounded completely by the growing city.

During the 15th century, the dukes of Brunswick-Wolfenbüttel moved their Residenz out of the city and to the nearby town of Wolfenbüttel. In 1616 the palas was remodelled in the renaissance style, while the rest of the castle was demolished or left to decay. During the 19th century, the castle keep served as a barrack, plans to demolish it completely were stopped by public protests in 1873. The present structure was rebuilt in 1887 by Ludwig Winter, based on archaeological investigations. Today the ground floor of Dankwarderode Castle houses the permanent collection of medieval objects of the Herzog Anton Ulrich Museum.

Gallery

References

Sources 
 Reinhold Wex: Burg Dankwarderode, in: Braunschweiger Stadtlexikon, herausgegeben im Auftrag der Stadt Braunschweig von Luitgard Camerer, Manfred R. W. Garzmann und Wolf-Dieter Schuegraf unter besonderer Mitarbeit von Norman-Mathias Pingel, Brunswick, 1992, page 52, .
 Georg Dehio: Handbuch der deutschen Kunstdenkmäler, Bremen/Niedersachsen, Deutscher Kunstverlag, 1977.
 Richard Moderhack: Braunschweiger Stadtgeschichte, Brunswick, 1997.

External links 

 Medieval Division of the Herzog Anton Ulrich Museum
 Dankwarderode Castle
 

Buildings and structures in Braunschweig
Museums in Lower Saxony
Brunswick, Dankwarderode
Castles in Lower Saxony
History of Brunswick
Rebuilt buildings and structures in Germany
Lowland castles